Amy Fisher: My Story is a 1992 American drama film directed by Bradford May and written by Phil Penningroth. The film stars Ed Marinaro, Noelle Parker, Boyd Kestner, Pierrette Grace, Lawrence Dane, Kate Lynch and Kathleen Laskey. The film premiered on NBC on December 28, 1992.

It is one of three television films produced based on the story of Amy Fisher's affair with Joey Buttafuoco, and her conviction for aggravated assault for shooting Buttafuoco's wife. The other two being The Amy Fisher Story and Casualties of Love: The "Long Island Lolita" Story, both broadcast in 1993.

Plot
Told from the viewpoint of teen Amy Fisher who claims Joey Buttafuoco seduced her, prostituted her, and coerced her into killing his wife.

Cast 
Ed Marinaro as Joey Buttafuoco
Noelle Parker as Amy Fisher
Boyd Kestner as Paul Makely
Pierrette Grace as Crystal
Lawrence Dane as Elliot Fisher
Kate Lynch as Roseann Fisher
Kathleen Laskey as Mary Jo
Rino Romano as Mick
Gemma Barry as Theresa
Kirsten Kieferle as Ellen
Tyley Ross as Tom
Henriette Ivanans as Darlene
Marianna Pascal as Aunt Violet
Jason Blicker as Darren
Lynn MacKenzie as Linda
Mario Di Iorio as Bobby
Jack Jessop as Joseph
Jessica Booker as Josephine

References

External links
 

1992 television films
1992 films
1992 drama films
NBC network original films
Crime films based on actual events
Films directed by Bradford May
American drama television films
1990s American films